Jadwisin  is a village in the administrative district of Gmina Wartkowice, within Poddębice County, Łódź Voivodeship, in central Poland.

The village has an approximate population of 70.

References

Villages in Poddębice County